The Pains of Being Pure at Heart were an American indie pop band from New York City, formed in 2007. The band centered around founding member and principal songwriter Kip Berman (vocals, guitar). In the band's final iteration, Berman was joined in concert by Christoph Hochheim (guitar), Jen Goma (keyboards, vocals), Jacob Sloan (bass), and Anton Hochheim (drums). Former members and contributors include Peggy Wang (keyboards, vocals), Connor Hanwick, Kurt Feldman and Alex Naidus.

History

Formation and early years (2007–2012)
Kip Berman, lead singer, guitarist, and principal songwriter, grew up in Philadelphia, but moved to Portland, Oregon, where he lived for several years. Berman played in numerous bands during that time. After finishing his college degree at Reed College, he moved to New York City, where he met Alex Naidus. The two bonded over their adoration for music, and their similar upbringing. Bands such as Smashing Pumpkins, The Field Mice, Black Tambourine, and Nirvana helped to establish the two as friends. Soon after, the trio played at the birthday party of friend and bandmate Peggy Wang. According to the musicians, they played "five songs in ten minutes, and the song names were longer than the songs". Using a backing track as a drummer, half of this setlist helped formulate the debut album.

In late 2007, The Pains started a MySpace page to showcase their songs. Berman noted that at the time, the band name was all the group had. The name comes from the title of an unpublished children's story by Charles Augustus Steen III (a friend of Berman's), which revolves around "realising what matters most in life – things like friendship and having a good time". The trio began working on numerous tracks. Songs such as "Contender", "Come Saturday", and "This Love Is Fucking Right!" would stay band favorites, winding up on the 2009 album The Pains of Being Pure at Heart. Other tracks, such as "Orchard of My Eye", would be released on their first EP. It was at the time of their MySpace uploads that attention was being drawn to the act. Prominent music websites, such as Pitchfork and Stereogum, kept tabs on The Pains of Being Pure at Heart.

After numerous shows around New York, the trio recruited Berman's roommate Kurt Feldman as drummer.  After playing more shows, both in and outside of the US — including regions as distant as China with promoters Split Works — the band recorded their inaugural LP. Their first self-released EP came out in 2007 on Painbow, a label created by the band. Their debut self-titled full-length album was released on February 3, 2009, via Slumberland Records, a favorite label of the band's. The album peaked at number nine on the Billboard Heatseekers chart. In 2009, they released Higher Than the Stars, their second EP.

The band's second album, entitled Belong, was released in 2011. It represented their commercial peak, reaching number 92 on the Billboard 200. It also charted worldwide, reaching the top 100 in Belgium, France, the United Kingdom, and Spain.

Later years and disbandment (2013–2019)
The group moved to New York-based label Yebo Music for the third effort, Days of Abandon, released in May 2014. Their next album, The Echo of Pleasure, was released on September 1, 2017, and self-distributed by the band.

The group recorded a full album cover of Tom Petty's 1989 album Full Moon Fever for subscription-based label Turntable Kitchen, released in November 2018. One year later, Berman announced that he had disbanded the project. He described feeling disconnected from the music he was writing after The Echo of Pleasure. In addition, he had relocated to New Jersey and became a father, suggesting the band was a "distinct moment" in his life that had passed. Berman has continued making music under the moniker The Natvral.

Band members

 Kip Berman – vocals, guitar
 Kurt Feldman – drums
 Alex Naidus – bass
 Peggy Wang – keyboards, vocals

Touring members
 Christoph Hochheim – guitar
 Brian Alvarez – drums
 Jacob Sloan – bass, vocals
 Jess Krichelle Rojas – vocals, keyboard
 Jen Goma - vocals, keyboard
 Jess Weiss - vocals, keyboard
 Drew Citron - keyboard

Discography

Albums

Cover albums
 Full Moon Fever (Turntable Kitchen, 2018) This album is a complete cover of Tom Petty's album of the same name, in commemoration of the one year anniversary of his death.

EPs
 The Pains of Being Pure at Heart EP (Painbow, 2007)
 Higher Than the Stars (Slumberland, 2009)
 Acid Reflex (Play It Again Sam, 2012, Purple Vinyl)
 Abandonment Issue (Yebo Music, 2014)
 Hell (Painbow Records, 2015)

Singles
 The Pains of Being Pure at Heart/The Parallelograms, split 7-inch with The Parallelograms (Atomic Beat, 2008)
 Searching for the Now Volume 4, split 7-inch with Summer Cats (Slumberland, 2008)
 "Everything with You / The Pains of Being Pure at Heart" (Slumberland, 2008, Blue vinyl)
 "Young Adult Friction / Ramona" (Slumberland, 2009, Maroon/white swirl vinyl)
 "Come Saturday / Side Ponytail" (Slumberland, 2009, Mint green clear vinyl)
 "Say No to Love / Lost Saint" (Slumberland U.S. + Fortuna Pop UK, June 8, 2010, Seafoam green vinyl)
 "Heart in Your Heartbreak / The One" (Slumberland, 2010, Plumb clear vinyl)
 "Belong / I Wanna Go All The Way" (Slumberland, 2011, Pink vinyl)
 "The Body / Tomorrow Dies Today" (Play It Again Sam / Slumberland, July 25, 2011, Yellow/orange clear vinyl)
 "Jeremy (Magnetic Fields Cover) / My Life Is Wrong (East River Pipe Cover)" (Slumberland, 2012, Army green vinyl)
 "Simple and Sure / Impossible" (Slumberland, 2014, Olive Green vinyl)
 "Sometimes Always (The Jesus and Mary Chain Cover)" with Hatchie (Heavenly/Double Double Whammy, 2020, Purple vinyl)

Compilation albums
 Acid Reflex (Yoshimoto R and C, 2012, Japan CD) This compilation combines the Acid Reflex EP with Higher Than The Stars remixes plus one additional remix only found on this compilation.

References

Bibliography
 Wong, Martin (2009). "Growing Pains". Giant Robot Magazine, issue 61.

Musical groups established in 2007
Musical groups disestablished in 2019
Musical groups from New York City
Indie pop groups from New York (state)
American shoegaze musical groups
Noise pop musical groups
Dream pop musical groups
2007 establishments in New York City
2019 disestablishments in New York (state)